Tone Center Records is a record label devoted to jazz fusion. It was founded by Mike Varney, who started the rock music label Shrapnel Records in 1980.

The label grew out of Varney's admiration for the jazz fusion of the 1970s and groups such as The Tony Williams Lifetime, Mahavishnu Orchestra, Return to Forever, and Soft Machine. Tone Center's early releases included drummer Steve Smith and guitarists Larry Coryell,  Frank Gambale, and Scott Henderson.

See also 
 List of record labels

References

External links
 Tone Center at Shrapnel Records

American independent record labels
Jazz record labels